Phespia is a genus of beetles in the family Cerambycidae, containing the following species:

 Phespia cercerina (Bates, 1870)
 Phespia corinna (Pascoe, 1866)
 Phespia gibbosa Magno, 1992
 Phespia simulans Bates, 1873

References

Rhinotragini